Flyleaf is the self-titled debut extended play by American rock band Flyleaf.

Track listing

Personnel 
Credits adapted from liner notes

Band
 Lacey Mosley – lead vocals
 James Culpepper – drums
 Sameer Bhattacharya – guitar
 Jared Hartmann – guitar
 Pat Seals – bass

Production (2004)
 Rick Parashar – producer 
 Kevin "Caveman" Shirley – mixing 
 Bradley Cook – producer, mixing 
 Chaz Harper – mastering

Production (2005)
 Mark Lewis – producer 
 Flyleaf – producer 
 Joe West – mixing 
 Leon Zervos – mastering
 Andy Vandette – mastering

Release history

References

2005 debut EPs
Flyleaf (band) albums
Polydor Records EPs

ru:Flyleaf (Альбом)